Rico Freimuth (born 14 March 1988) is a retired German athlete who specialised in the decathlon. He won two medals at World Championships, bronze in 2015 and silver in 2017.

Rico is the son of Uwe Freimuth, a decathlete, and the nephew of Jörg Freimuth, a high jumper.

Achievements

References

External links

1988 births
Living people
Sportspeople from Potsdam
People from Bezirk Potsdam
German decathletes
Olympic athletes of Germany
Athletes (track and field) at the 2012 Summer Olympics
Athletes (track and field) at the 2016 Summer Olympics
World Athletics Championships athletes for Germany
World Athletics Championships medalists